John fitzRichard (fl. 1076) was an Anglo-Norman nobleman who became a landowner in England following the Norman Conquest.

Biography
He was a son of Richard fitzRanulf, and nephew of Waleran fitzRanulf, whose father Ranulf 'the Moneyer' had bought the mill at Vains, Normandy in 1035. A 14th-century document from the cartulary of Malton priory refers to John as brother of Serlo de Burgo, but contemporary evidence indicates this is probably false. John, who was apparently born by 1056, seized the mill of Vains, Normandy in 1076. The King's Court of William I of England ruled against the seizure, returning the mill to the Abbey of Mont-Saint-Michel. In the 1086 Domesday survey as 'John, nephew of Waleran', he was reported holding Carbrooke, Hunstanton, Ringstead, Rushford, Saxlingham, Thurton, Walpole (St Andrew and St Peter) in Norfolk and Elsenham in Essex. He also held as tenant in chief: Brettenham, Griston and West Carbrooke in Norfolk.

Marriage and issue
John is known to have had the following issue:
Pain fitzJohn (died 1137)
Eustace fitzJohn (died 1157)
William fitzJohn 
Alice, abbess of Barking Abbey
Agnes, married Roger de Valognes

Citations

References
 

11th-century English nobility
11th-century English landowners
11th-century Normans
Anglo-Normans
11th-century births
Year of birth unknown
Year of death unknown